Kounov may refer to:

 Kounov (Rakovník District)
 Kounov (Rychnov nad Kněžnou District)